Paul-Eerik Rummo (born January 19, 1942) is an Estonian poet, playwright, translator and politician who was the former Estonian Minister of Culture and Education, as well as the former Estonian Minister of Population Affairs.

Rummo was born in Tallinn, the son of Estonian writer Paul Rummo. Paul-Eerik studied literature at the University of Tartu, graduating in 1965. Rummo has worked in Estonian theatres.

Personal life
Paul-Eerik Rummo is married to an actress, poet, author, and translator Viiu Härm. The couple have three daughters.

Legacy
In October 1980, Rummo was a signatory of the Letter of 40 Intellectuals, a public letter in which forty prominent Estonian intellectuals defended the Estonian language and protested the Russification policies of the Kremlin in Estonia.  The signatories also expressed their unease against Republic-level government in harshly dealing with youth protests in Tallinn that were sparked a week earlier due to the banning of a public performance of the punk rock band Propeller.

In the novel Purge (in Finnish Puhdistus) by Sofi Oksanen, Rummo's poetry becomes a symbol of resistance against Russification in Estonia, sprinkled throughout the narrative.

Selected bibliography

Poetry
Ankruhiivaja (The Anchor-weigher), 1962
Lumevalgus … lumepimedus (Snow Light … Snow Darkness), 1966
Saatja aadress ja teised luuletused 1968-1972 (Sender's Address and Other Poems 1968-1972), 1989.
The September Sun. Facing bilingual with English translations by Ritva Poom. Cross-Cultural Communications, 1994.

Plays
Tuhkatriinumäng (Cinderellagame), printed 1969

References

External links
Estonian Writers Online Dictionary

Estonian male poets
1942 births
Living people
Writers from Tallinn
Politicians from Tallinn
Government ministers of Estonia
University of Tartu alumni
Recipients of the Order of the National Coat of Arms, 4th Class
21st-century Estonian politicians
20th-century Estonian poets
21st-century Estonian poets
Recipients of the Order of the White Star, 2nd Class
Members of the Riigikogu, 1992–1995
Members of the Riigikogu, 1995–1999
Members of the Riigikogu, 1999–2003
Members of the Riigikogu, 2003–2007
Members of the Riigikogu, 2007–2011
Members of the Riigikogu, 2011–2015
Members of the Riigikogu, 2015–2019